Didan may refer to:
 Didan-e Olya
 Didan-e Sofla